The Women's free combination  event at the 2015 European Games in Baku took place 13 and 16 June at the Baku Aquatics Centre.

Schedule
All times are local (UTC+5).

Results
Green denotes finalists

References

External links

Combination